Cái Vồn is ward and capital of Bình Minh town in Vĩnh Long province, Vietnam.

The ward covers area of 2.1915 km² and its population in 2012 was 18,105 with density of 8.216 citizens/km².

References 

Populated places in Vĩnh Long province